Club Balonmano Femenino Elda, also known as Elda Prestigio for sponsorship reasons, is a Spanish women's handball team from Elda, Valencian Community founded in 1985.

Elda was promoted in 1992 to the División de Honor, where it played for the next two decades. In the late 1990s it became a national powerhouse, winning four leagues and two national cups between 1999 and 2008. The team's major success in European competition was reaching the 2005 Champions League quarter-finals and the 2010 EHF Cup final, lost to Randers HK. It also reached the EHF Cup and Cup Winners' Cup's semifinals in 1998, 2002 and 2007.

In June 2012 Elda asked to be relegated to the third tier due to financial strain.

Titles
 Liga ABF (4)
 1999, 2003, 2004, 2008
 Copa de la Reina (2)
 2002, 2005
 Supercopa de España (2)
 2004, 2008
 Copa ABF (1)
 2005

Season to season

20 seasons in División de Honor

References

Spanish handball clubs
Sports teams in the Valencian Community
Handball clubs established in 1985
1985 establishments in Spain